Culex (Lophoceraomyia) wardi is a species of mosquito belonging to the genus Culex. It is endemic to Sri Lanka.

References

External links 
Culex sinensis Theo. a possible vector of Wuchereria bancrofti in Calcutta.

wardi
Insects described in 1977